The Amherstburg Admirals are a Canadian junior ice hockey club based in Amherstburg, Ontario, Canada.  They are members of the Provincial Junior Hockey League of the Ontario Hockey Association.

From 1987 until 2013, the team was located in Kingsville, Ontario, as the Kingsville Comets.

History
In the late 1980s the perennial powerhouse Leamington Flyers seemed poised to make a jump to the Western Ontario Junior B Hockey League.  The GLJHL granted expansion to the Comets right on Leamington's doorstep.  In 1992, the Flyers finally made the jump and a lot of the local skill attributed to the Flyers switched over to the Comets.  Throughout the 1990s and early 2000s the Comets would be competitive.
As the 2000s wore on, despite a newly renovated arena from the municipality, performance on the ice and attendance greatly declined.

The 2011-2012 season was the Kingsville Comets 25th year of play in the Great Lakes Jr. C league.

In April 2013, the team had struck a tentative deal with the Ontario Hockey Association and the town of Amherstburg, Ontario, to relocate the struggling franchise.  Amherstburg had recently constructed a new arena which only required minor upgrades to host a Junior C team.  In 26 years in Kingsville the team failed to win a league championship or appear in the GLJHL final.  Due to Kingsville's location, the Comets usually ran into either the Essex 73's or the Belle River Canadiens by either the division semi-final or final.  In the Comets' 26 seasons, Essex and Belle River combined for 22 league titles.

On September 15, 2013, the Admirals made their hometown debut against the defending league champion Essex 73's.  The Admirals would fall 6-0 in front of a sold-out crowd. Chris Wallace played the entire game for the Admirals, making 29 saves.  The next night, the Admirals traveled to Wheatley, Ontario, for their first road game and came home with their first win.  Josh Lafromboise scored the Admirals' first ever goal at 10:38 into the first period and Dan Matoski scored the game winner 1:54 in the third to take a 6-4 victory over the Wheatley Sharks.  Chris Wallace picked up the first ever victory in net.

Season-by-season record

References

External links

Great Lakes Junior C Hockey League teams
1987 establishments in Ontario
Ice hockey clubs established in 1987
Amherstburg, Ontario